The 2014–15 NBL Canada season was the fourth season of the National Basketball League of Canada (NBL Canada). The NBL Canada contracted to 8 teams for 2014–15 after the ownership of the Ottawa SkyHawks were revoked by the league following the 2013–14 season.

Offseason
During preseason, the NBL Canada's Board of Governors voted to revoke the ownership rights of Bytown Sports & Entertainment Inc., who operated the Ottawa SkyHawks. The league is working to find a new ownership group to bring the NBL Canada back to Ottawa, as soon as next season.

Sam Hill was appointed NBL Canada Deputy Commissioner and General Counsel

The owner of the Moncton Miracles, Kim Blanco, left the team without an owner during the off season.

Rule changes

The league will play a 32 game schedule (down from 40 in the previous two seasons) and take a break in the weeks heading up to Christmas.

The minimum number of Canadians on a team has been increased from 3 to 4.

The off season protected players list has been increased from 5 to 6.

Coaching changes

Offseason
On July 17, 2014, the London Lightning hired Carlos Knox as head coach.

General Manager changes

Offseason

On September 10, 2014, the London Lightning hired Bill Smith as general manager.

On October 1, 2014, the Moncton Miracles hired Joe Salerno Sr. as general manager.

Draft
The 2014 NBL Canada Draft took place on August 24 at the Wegz Stadium Bar in Vaughan, Ontario. 160 players competed over the weekend at the Pre-Draft Combine at the Athlete Institute in Mono, Ontario. 40 players were nominated to attend the Draft with the possibility of being selected. Following the combine, the Mississauga Power drafted Indiana Wesleyan guard Jordan Weidner with the first overall pick.

Regular season
The regular season began on November 1, 2014 and concluded on February 28, 2015.

Standings

Playoffs

* Division winner
Bold Series winner

Finals 

All times local.

Notable occurrences
 NBL Canada's Board of Governors voted on July 30 to remove the Ottawa SkyHawks' ownership group. The SkyHawks will not participate in the 2014-15 season.
 Sam Hill was appointed deputy commissioner and general counsel of the NBL Canada on August 7.

References

External links
 

 
National Basketball League of Canada seasons
NBL